The Barfleur-class ships of the line were a class of four 90-gun second rates, designed for the Royal Navy by Sir Thomas Slade.

Design
The design for the Barfleur class was based upon HMS Royal William.

Ships

Builder: Chatham Dockyard
Ordered: 1 March 1762
Launched: 30 July 1768
Fate: Broken up, 1819

Builder: Chatham Dockyard
Ordered: 11 June 1766
Launched: 31 August 1772
Fate: Broken up, 1839

Builder: Portsmouth Dockyard
Ordered: 10 September 1767
Launched: 18 October 1773
Fate: Broken up, 1807

Builder: Chatham Dockyard
Ordered: 17 August 1768
Launched: 20 August 1777
Fate: Broken up, 1813

References

 Lavery, Brian (2003). The Ship of the Line Volume 1: The Development of the Battlefleet 1650–1850. Conway Maritime Press. .
 Winfield, Rif (2007). British Warships in the Age of Sail 1714–1792: Design, Construction, Careers and Fates. Seaforth Publishing. .

 
Ship classes of the Royal Navy
Ship of the line classes